The 2022–23 Futsal Club Championship is the 2nd edition of the Futsal Club Championship, an annual futsal club tournament in India organised by the All India Football Federation (AIFF), held in New Delhi.

Format 
The Futsal Club Championship 2022–23 features a total of 14 teams, who were divided into two groups, and play in a round-robin format. The semi-final stage is played in a knockout format between the top four group stage teams.

Teams 
The following 14 teams participated.

Group stage

Group A

Group B

Knockout stage

Bracket

Semi-finals

Final

Top scorers

See also
2022–23 Santosh Trophy
2023 National Beach Soccer Championship

References 

Futsal competitions in India
Futsal Club Championship
2023
2023 in Asian futsal
Futsal Club Championship
Football in Delhi